Exhumed may refer to:
Exhumation, the digging up of a body post burial
Exhumed (video game), a first-person shooter
Exhumed (band), a death metal band
 Exhumed Films, a Philadelphia-based "organization
 Exhumed river channel, a ridge of sandstone
 Exhumed (film), a 2003 Canadian horror anthology film